Coatbridge North is one of the twenty-one wards used to elect members of the North Lanarkshire Council. It elects four councillors. Covering neighbourhoods in the north of Coatbridge (Blairhill, Cliftonville, Drumpellier, Dunbeth, Gartsherrie, Greenhill, Parklands, Summerlee, Sunnyside, Townhead and the town centre), the ward had a population of 15,146 in 2019.

It was created in 2007 as Coatbridge North and Glenboig, originally covering around twice as much territory between Coatbridge and Condorrat about  further north, largely rural and sparsely populated but including the expanding commuter village of Glenboig. A nationwide boundary review in 2017 that recommended more representation for the area overall led to this rural half being placed in a separate new ward (along with Gartcosh and Moodiesburn from the Strathkelvin ward), but the electorate in the existing ward reduced only a slightly as a result and the number of seats was unaffected.

Councillors

Election Results

2017 Election

2012 Election

2016 By-election
Councillor Fulton James McGregor was elected as a MSP for Coatbridge and Chryston in the 2016 Scottish Parliament election. On 29 June 2016 he resigned his council seat. A by-election was held on 22 September 2016 which was won by Labour's Alex McVey.

2007 Election

2009 By-election
The SNP's John Wilson resigned following his election as an MSP. Peter Sullivan gained the seat for Labour in the resulting by-election.

2011 By-election
Labour Party's Tony Clarke died on 24 August 2011. Michael McPake held the seat in the resulting by-election.

References

Wards of North Lanarkshire
Coatbridge